Scaduto is an Italian surname. Notable people with the surname include:

Al Scaduto (1928–2007), American comic strip cartoonist
Anthony Scaduto (1932–2017), American journalist and writer
Antonio Scaduto (born 1977), Italian sprint canoeist

Italian-language surnames